Lokalavisa NordSalten (The North Salten Local Gazette) is a Norwegian newspaper that covers the municipalities of Steigen, Hamarøy, and Tysfjord in Nordland. The current version of the newspaper was established in 1996, and the first issue was published on January 5 that year. The main office is located in the village of Innhavet in the municipality of Hamarøy. The chief editor is Børge Strandskog, who has served since 1996. The newspaper is published in Bokmål with a part in Lule Sami on Fridays. 

A test issue of Lokalavisa NordSalten was produced on May 27, 1982. The issue included a section in Lule Sami written by Sven-Roald Nystø. Another test issue was published in 1983, and then the paper appeared regularly starting in 1984 until it went bankrupt in October 1985.

Circulation
According to the Norwegian Audit Bureau of Circulations and National Association of Local Newspapers, Lokalavisa NordSalten has had the following annual circulation:
2004: 2,465
2005: 2,624
2006: 2,581
2007: 2,536
2008: 2,428
2009: 2,723
2010: 2,655
2011: 2,871
2012: 2,838
2013: 2,847
2014: 2,789
2015: 2,872
2016: 2,626

References

External links
Lokalavisa NordSalten homepage

Newspapers published in Norway
Norwegian-language newspapers
Lule Sámi
Hamarøy
Mass media in Nordland
Publications established in 1996
1996 establishments in Norway
Sámi-language mass media